Chicken Trek: The Third Strange Thing That Happened to Oscar Noodleman is a 1987 children's comedy novel by Stephen Manes with drawings by Ron Barrett, illustrator of Cloudy with a Chance of Meatballs.

As the title implies, it is the third of a series told by from the viewpoint of the protagonist Oscar Noodleman. It follows That Game from Outer Space and  The Oscar J. Noodleman Television Network.

Plot summary
In Chicken Trek, Oscar Noodleman goes to Secaucus, New Jersey to visit his cousin Dr. Prechtwinkle, an inventor. Before this, however, he had dropped Dr. Prechtwinkle's valuable camera, and now has to work for him to repay the debt.  Dr. Prechtwinkle tells Oscar about a contest where the goal is to eat a "Bagful o' Chicken" at all 211 Chicken in a Bag restaurants nationwide. The prize from this contest would pay Oscar's debt, so they attempt to win it.

1st edition: New York : Dutton, c1987,

References

 Book Review. Ebsco Host. 
 Book Review. Kirkus Reviews.

1987 American novels
American children's novels
Novels set in New Jersey
Secaucus, New Jersey
1987 children's books